H.N.I.C. Pt. 2 is the second solo album by American rapper Prodigy of Mobb Deep. The album was released on April 22, 2008. It is a sequel to H.N.I.C., released in 2000. The album features production by The Alchemist, Sid Roams, Havoc and Apex. The album features guest appearances from artists that frequently work with Prodigy, including Havoc, Un Pacino, Nyce, Big Noyd, Twin Gambino and Cormega.

Track list

Charts

References

External links
Official website

Prodigy (rapper) albums
2008 albums
E1 Music albums
Albums produced by the Alchemist (musician)
Albums produced by Apex (producer)
Albums produced by Havoc (musician)
Sequel albums